New Sheets is the third and final studio album by the American alternative rock band Possum Dixon. It was released in 1998 on  Interscope Records.

Production
Many of the songs were cowritten by outside musicians: Jane Weidlin, Fred Schneider, Dave Stewart, and producer Ric Ocasek.

Critical reception
The A.V. Club wrote that "Ric Ocasek's production stamp is all over New Sheets—it sounds as much like The Cars as any outside project he's produced—which only adds to its glossy appeal." The Washington Post called the album "typical of song-doctored mainstream-rock albums: reliably crafted and uniformly melodic, but a little anonymous." CMJ New Music Monthly wrote: "Rich in '80s-era sheen, New Sheets is mostly crisp and studied in the detached-cool manner Ocasek made popular in his heyday."

Track listing 
 "Song from a Box" (Rob Zabrecky, Ric Ocasek) - 0:48
 "Holding (Lenny's Song)" (Zabrecky, Celso Chavez, Byron Reynolds, Matt Devine) - 3:09
 "Only in the Summertime" (Zabrecky, Chavez, Reynolds, Devine) - 3:12
 "Firecracker" (Zabrecky, Fred Schneider) - 3:02
 "New Sheets" (Zabrecky, Chavez, Reynolds, Devine) - 4:43
 "Always Engines" (Zabrecky, Mark Hudson, Trey Bruce) - 3:05
 "Stop Breaking Me" (Zabrecky, Chavez, Reynolds, Devine) - 3:43
 "Now What?" (Zabrecky, Chavez) - 3:46
 "Plan B" (Zabrecky) - 3:04
 "Heavenly" (Zabrecky) - 4:03
 "Faultlines" (Jane Weidlin, Pat MacDonald, Zabrecky) - 4:06
 "What You Mean" (Zabrecky, Chavez, Reynolds, Devine) - 2:29
 "End's Beginning" (Zabrecky, Dave Stewart) - 4:17

Personnel 
Possum Dixon
 Rob Zabrecky - vocals, bass, keyboards
 Celso Chavez - guitar, vocals
 Byron Reynolds - drums and such
Additional musicians
 Matt Devine - guitar
 Jane Weidlin - vocals
 Brian Sperber - keyboards
 Ric Ocasek - keyboards

References 

Possum Dixon albums
1998 albums
Interscope Records albums
Albums produced by Ric Ocasek